Fameal is a general word for a food product, used by Non-governmental organizations (NGOs), in programs to feed the hungry as a part of the Agricultural Act of 1949. The food product is made up of a wheat-soy meal blend or a cornmeal-soy blend (WSB or CSB, corn soy blend). This food is distributed, often aided by volunteers, in the Caribbean and West Africa.

Typical usage
A premade mix of fameal is extrusion cooked for usage under primitive conditions. In this form, the meal is eaten as a thin paste or thickened and made into dumplings or bread. The taste is sometimes described as "foody" and some consider it delicious. The cooked product can be added to soups and casseroles or made into cookies.

Nutritional components

The general measures of fameal are:

 50% (by volume) Cornmeal or Wheat Meal.
 30% (by volume) Bean meal, of any kind, including soy. Lentils are sometimes used due to ease of grinding and fast cooking.
 10% (by volume) Cooking Oil. Any cooking oil works.
 10% (by volume) Sugar, honey, syrup, or similar sweetener.
 Salt for taste.
 Multi-vitamin powder, or multi-vitamins ground to a meal.

The fameal is a powder which can be mixed slowly with boiling water (three cups of water per cup of meal). Once boiling, remove heat, cover, and allow to cook for 10 minutes. Alternatively, the meal can be used as a flour replacement for baking, similar to cornbread, or as a cake mix.

CSB Plus - formula ingredients percentage (by weight):

 Corn (white or yellow) 78.47
 Whole soybeans 20
 Vitamin/Mineral 0.20
 Tri-Calcium Phosphate 1.16
 Potassium chloride 0.17

Nutritional value per 100g dry matter:
 a. Energy: 380 kcal minimum
 b. Protein: 14.0% (N x 6.25) minimum
 c. Fat: 6.0% minimum
 d. Crude Fiber: 5.0% maximum

References

Food preparation
Famines